Kim Clijsters was the defending champion, but was forced to withdraw due to a left ankle injury.

Justine Henin-Hardenne won the title by defeating Amélie Mauresmo 6–4, 6–4 in the final.

Seeds
The first four seeds received a bye into the second round.

Draw

Finals

Top half

Bottom half

External links
 ITF results archive
 WTA results archive

Women's Singles
Singles